The Citizens Flag Alliance (CFA) is an American organization advocating in favor of the Flag Burning Amendment project.  CFA was founded in 1989 by the American Legion and originally called the Citizens' Flag Honor Guard.

Member organizations 
Over 140 organizations "representing millions of Americans" have joined the Alliance since it was incorporated in June 1994. Notable member organizations include:

 AMVETS (American Veterans)
 Air Force Association
 Air Force Sergeants Association
 American GI Forum of the U.S.
 American Legion
 American Legion Auxiliary
 American War Mothers
 Ancient Order of Hibernians
 Association of the U.S. Army
 Benevolent and Protective Order of Elks
 Catholic War Veterans
 Daughters of the American Colonists
 Drum Corps Associates
 Family Research Council
 Fleet Reserve Association
 Forty and Eight veterans organization
 Gold Star Wives of America, Inc.
 Grand Aerie, Fraternal Order of Eagles
 Grand Lodge Fraternal Order of Police
 Great Council of Texas, Order of Red Men
 Hungarian Reformed Federation of America
 Jewish War Veterans of the USA
 Just Marketing, Inc.
 Knights of Columbus
 MBNA America
 Marine Corps League
 Military Officers Association of Indianapolis, MOAA (formally The Retired Officers Association of Indianapolis, TROA)
 Military Order of the Purple Heart of the U.S.A.
 The Military Order of the Foreign Wars
 Moose International
 National Alliance of Families for the Return of America's Missing Servicemen
 National Center for Public Policy Research
 National Defense Committee
 National Federation of State High School Associations
 National FFA (Future Farmers of America)
 National Grange
 National Guard Association of the United States
 National League of Families of American Prisoners and Missing in SE Asia
 National Society of the Daughters of the American Revolution
 National Society of the Sons of the American Revolution
 Native Daughters of the Golden West
 Native Sons of the Golden West
 Naval Enlisted Reserve Association (NERA)
 Navy League of the United States
 Polish American Congress
 Polish Falcons of America
 Polish Home Army
 Polish Legion of American Veterans, U.S.A.
 Polish Legion of American Veterans Ladies Auxiliary
 Polish National Alliance
 Polish Roman Catholic Union of North America
 Polish Women's Alliance
 Ruritan National
 Scottish Rite of Freemasonry - Northern Masonic Jurisdiction
 Supreme Council, Scottish Rite (Southern Jurisdiction, USA)
 Sons of Confederate Veterans
 Sons of Union Veterans of the Civil War
 Standing Rock Sioux Tribe
 The General Society, Sons of the Revolution
 Reserve Officers Association of the United States
 Women's Army Corps Veterans' Association
 Women's Overseas Service League
 Woodmen of the World

See also
 Flag desecration

References

External links
 Official site
 SourceWatch article

American Legion
Political organizations based in the United States
Organizations established in 1989
Flag controversies in the United States